Cugliate-Fabiasco is a comune (municipality) in the Province of Varese in the Italian region Lombardy, located about  northwest of Milan and about  north of Varese.

Cugliate-Fabiasco borders the following municipalities: Cadegliano-Viconago, Cremenaga, Cuasso al Monte, Cunardo, Grantola, Marchirolo, Montegrino Valtravaglia, Valganna.

Demographic evolution

References

Cities and towns in Lombardy